Mr & Mrs Murder is a 13-part Australian crime comedy television series produced by FremantleMedia Australia in association with Bravado Productions. It originally ran on Network Ten on from 20 February to 15 May 2013. The murder mystery series follows the adventures of married couple Nicola and Charlie Buchanan, who run an industrial cleaning business specialising in crime scenes. They use this experience to become amateur sleuths. In the United Kingdom, the show was shown on satellite channel Sky Living, and picked up for broadcast by Channel 5 from Network Ten along with the shows Wentworth and Secrets and Lies.

Cast
Shaun Micallef as Charlie Buchanan
Kat Stewart as Nicola Buchanan
Jonny Pasvolsky as Detective Peter Vinetti
Lucy Honigman as Jess Chalmers

Episodes

DVD and Blu-ray releases

See also
 Crime Scene Cleaner (TV series)

References

External links

Network 10 original programming
Australian comedy-drama television series
2010s Australian crime television series
2013 Australian television series debuts
2013 Australian television series endings
2010s mystery television series
Mystery television series
Detective television series
English-language television shows
Television series by Fremantle (company)
Television shows set in Melbourne